= Emilia Sukertowa-Biedrawina =

Polish writer and educational activist (1887–1970)

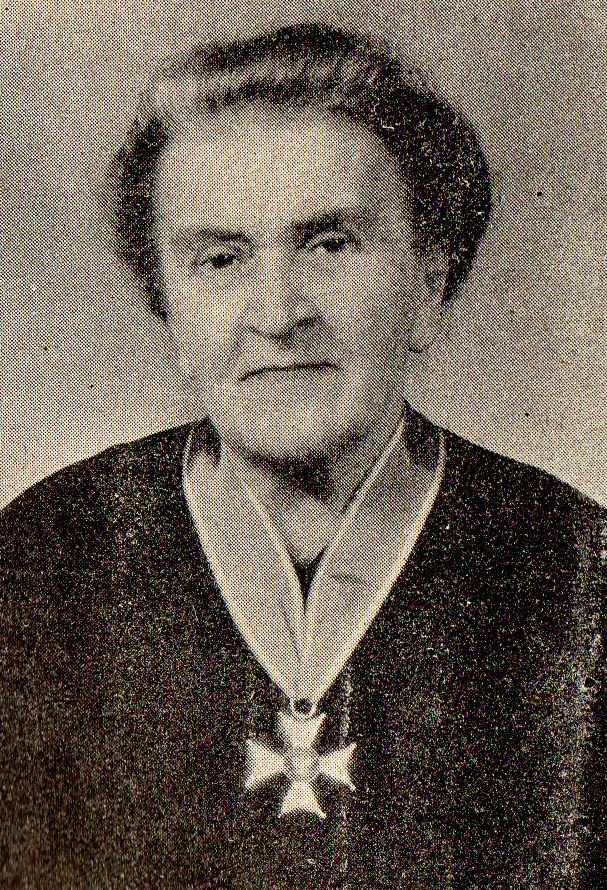
Emilia Sukertowa Biedrawina

Emilia Sukertowa-Biedrawina (29 January 1887 in Łódź — 27 December 1970 in Pruszków) was a Polish writer and educational activist. She is considered one of the most prominent researchers of the history of Warmia and Mazury.

== Publications ==
- E. Sukertowa, Zamek w Ojcowie, Warszawa 1922,
- E. Sukertowa, Legendy mazurskie, Warszawa 1923,
- E. Sukertowa, Polskość Mazowsza Pruskiego, 1925,
- E. Sukertowa, Mazurzy w Prusach Wschodnich, Biblioteczka „Orbis”, 1927,
- E. Sukertowa-Biedrawina, Legendy Nadprądnikowe, Warszawa: PTK, 1928,
- E. Sukertowa-Biedrawina, Na „Szlaku Jagiełłowym”. Powiat działdowski a król Władysław Jagiełło, Działdowo 1934,
- E. Sukertowa-Biedrawina, Zarys piśmiennictwa polskiego na Mazurach Pruskich, Muzeum Mazurskie, Działdowo 1935,
- E. Sukertowa-Biedrawina, Diabeł na Mazurach w bajkach i podaniach, 1936,
- E. Sukertowa-Biedrawina, Z przeszłości Działdowa, 1936,
- E. Sukertowa-Biedrawina, Działdowo w XVIII wieku, 1937,
- E. Sukertowa-Biedrawina, Przewodnik krajoznawczo-historyczny po działdowskim powiecie, 1937,
- E. Sukertowa-Biedrawina, Bojownicy o wolność i polskość Mazur i Warmii na przestrzeni siedmiu wieków, Olsztyn 1953,
- E. Sukertowa-Biedrawina, T. Grygier, Walka o społeczne i narodowe wyzwolenie ludności Warmii i Mazur (Przewodnik po wystawie), Olsztyn 1956,
- E. Sukertowa-Biedrawina, Działdowszczyzna po Kongresie Wersalskim, Komunikaty Mazursko-Warmińskie nr 2 (57), 1957,
- E. Sukertowa-Biedrawina, Karty z dziejów Mazur, 1965,
- E. Sukertowa-Biedrawina, Dawno a niedawno. Wspomnienia, Olsztyn 1965,
- E. Sukertowa-Biedrawina, Wystawa Kopernika w Olsztynie, Komunikaty Mazursko-Warmińskie nr 1 (91), 1966,
- E. Sukertowa-Biedrawina, B. Wilamowski, Rozwój nauki polskiej w Olsztynie po wyzwoleniu, Szkice Olsztyńskie, Olsztyn 1967,
- E. Sukertowa-Biedrawina, Ze wspomnień redaktora „Komunikatów”, Komunikaty Mazursko-Warmińskie nr 2, 1968.

== Sources ==
- Tadeusz Oracki, Emilia Sukertowa-Biedrawina (1887–1970), Rocznik Mazowiecki 5, 1974, pp. 423–428.
